Cuban-American MC and rapper Pitbull has released eleven studio albums, four compilation albums, one soundtrack album, four official mixtapes, over 300 singles (including features), over 1,000 songs (in total), and over 200 music videos. Pitbull has the most collaborations among any other music artist.

M.I.A.M.I., Pitbull's debut album, was released on August 24, 2004, on TVT Records. It peaked at number fourteen on the US Billboard 200 albums chart. The album's lead single, "Culo", peaked at No. 32 on the US Billboard Hot 100, becoming his first entry on the chart. The album spawned an additional four singles: "That's Nasty", "Back Up", "Toma", and "Dammit Man". Money Is Still a Major Issue, a remix album of content from M.I.A.M.I., was released on November 15, 2005. El Mariel, Pitbull's second studio album, was released on October 30, 2006, and spawned four singles: "Bojangles", "Ay Chico (Lengua Afuera)", a remix of "Dime", and "Be Quiet".

The Boatlift, Pitbull's third studio album, was released on November 27, 2007. The album's second single, "The Anthem", peaked at No. 36 on the Billboard Hot 100, becoming his most successful entry on the chart at the time since "Culo". The single also garnered commercial success in several European territories. Helmed by the success of the single, The Boatlift became his first album to garner commercial success outside of the United States, peaking on the national album charts of France, Spain, and Switzerland. The album also spawned three singles: "Secret Admirer", "Go Girl", and "Sticky Icky". It also features collaborations with Twista, Jason Derulo, Lil Jon and more.

Pitbull Starring in Rebelution, Pitbull's fourth studio album, was released on September 1, 2009. It was his first album to be released by the Polo Grounds/J Records label, following his signing to the label through his own imprint, Mr. 305. The album was preceded by three singles: "Krazy", "I Know You Want Me (Calle Ocho)", and "Hotel Room Service". "I Know You Want Me (Calle Ocho)" became Pitbull's breakout into international success, peaking at number two on the Billboard Hot 100 and reaching the top ten in several European territories. "Hotel Room Service" and the subsequent single "Shut It Down" also achieved significant commercial success. The album also spawned a fifth single, "Can't Stop Me Now". Armando, Pitbull's fifth studio album, was released on November 2, 2010. It was his first primarily Spanish album and spawned four singles: "Watagatapitusberry", "Maldito Alcohol", "Bon, Bon", and "Tu Cuerpo".

Planet Pit, Pitbull's sixth studio album, was released on June 17, 2011. It has become his most commercially successful album to date, peaking at number seven on the Billboard 200 and peaking in the top ten on the national album charts of several territories. The album was preceded by two singles, the international hits "Hey Baby (Drop It to the Floor)", which peaked at No. 7 on the Billboard Hot 100, and "Give Me Everything", which peaked at number one on the Billboard Hot 100 as well as in the United Kingdom. It became his first number-one single in both countries. The album's subsequent singles, "Rain Over Me" and "International Love", also garnered significant commercial success. The Pitbull song "Back in Time" was released in 2012 as the lead single from the soundtrack to the film Men in Black 3, peaking at No. 11 on the Billboard Hot 100. His seventh studio album, Global Warming, was released on November 16, 2012, and produced the hit singles "Get It Started", "Don't Stop the Party", and "Feel This Moment". On October 7, 2013, he released a song with Kesha, named "Timber" which was followed by the Meltdown EP. Pitbull later released Global Warming: The Meltdown which combined Global Warming and the Meltdown EP.

On November 21, 2014, Pitbull released his eighth studio album that was titled Globalization. The album was preceded by the singles "Wild Wild Love", "We Are One (Ole Ola)", "Fireball" and "Time of Our Lives". The album also features the lead single from the 2014 animated film, Penguins of Madagascar, titled "Celebrate". Pitbull later released the single "Fun" with American R&B recording artist Chris Brown.

Pitbull released his ninth studio album and second Spanish album Dale in 2015. It won Pitbull his first Grammy Award. He followed this with his tenth studio album, Climate Change, on March 17, 2017. Pitbull's fourth compilation album, Greatest Hits, was released on December 1, 2017, and features two new recordings.

Pitbull released his first full-length soundtrack album for the film Gotti alongside Jorge Gómez on June 16, 2018. Pitbull's vocals are featured on two tracks on the album, "So Sorry" and "Amore" (featuring Leona Lewis), both of which were released as singles following the album's release.

Pitbull released his latest album Libertad 548 on September 27, 2019. The new album includes the RIAA Latin 9× Platinum hit single "No Lo Trates" featuring Daddy Yankee and Natti Natasha. The album spawned RIAA Latin Platinum single "Me Quedaré Contigo" with frequent collaborator Ne-Yo, and was certified RIAA Latin Platinum on January 28, 2021.

Pitbull has sold over 25 million studio albums and over 100 million singles worldwide. He has over 15 billion views on YouTube as of May 2020. Pitbull was ranked by Billboard as the 45th Top Artist of the 2010s and the 24th Top Latin Artist of the 2010s.

Albums

Studio albums

Deluxe albums

Soundtrack albums

Compilation albums

Mixtapes

EPs

Singles

As lead artist

As featured artist

Promotional singles

Other charted songs

Guest appearances

DVDs

Notes

References

External links
 Official website
 
 
 

Discographies of American artists
Hip hop discographies
Pop music discographies